The Marylebone Cricket Club tour of Australia in 1954-55 under the captaincy of Len Hutton was its eleventh since it took official control of overseas tours in 1903-04. The touring team played as England in the Ashes series against Australia, but as MCC in all other games. In all there were 23 matches; 5 Test matches (which England won 3–1), 12 other First Class matches (which they won 5–1) and 6 minor matches (which they won 5–0). It was the only time that a professional cricketer captained an MCC tour of Australia. It was one of the MCC's most successful tours, the Ashes being retained and the team winning five of their victories by an innings.

Travelling to Australia
The MCC team gathered at Lord's for an eve of departure dinner during which the "Success of the Team" was toasted. In those days the MCC saw tours as a means of encouraging overseas cricket and strengthening the ties that bound the Commonwealth. Lord Cobham gave a speech in which he reminded the team that it was more important to not disgrace the face of English cricket even at the cost of series, though several young players had other ideas about this. The party was a large one of 18 players, Denis Compton suffered a recurrence of his knee trouble which had plagued him on the 1950-51 tour and required remedial surgery. Yorkshire's "Farmer Vic" Wilson was a surprise choice as his replacement and Compton was later flown out to join the team in Australia. The other 17 were seen off by family, friends and well-wishers on the Orsava. Frank Tyson saw "a spare, stooped old man, dressed immaculately in a pin-stripe suit" telling the young Colin Cowdrey, "when you reach Australia, just remember one thing - hate the bastards!". He spoke with such vehemence that Tyson asked George Duckworth who the old gent was, "That was Douglas Jardine", the reason behind Lord Cobham's speech on good sportsmanship. They travelled first class on the Orsova, which took six weeks to arrive in Western Australia, after stopping for a one-day game against Ceylon. Unused to the lavish fare and freed of rationing, the players soon added weight and Frank Tyson increased his weight from 161 lbs (73 kg) to 182 lbs (83 kg). Unfortunately for the Australians he exercised regularly so the extra weight was turned into muscle. Soon after the voyage began Vic Wilson, Colin Cowdrey, Peter Loader, Jim McConnon, Keith Andrew and Frank Tyson were warned by Len Hutton that they were secondary players who were expected to play little part in the Test matches.

Western Australia Country vs MCC

The tourists arrived in Fremantle on 7 October and Cowdrey learnt by telegram that his father had died, but he decided to continue the tour. Four days later played their first match of a long tour against a local Country XI on a small, sandy ground 20 yards from the beach. The A.C.B. liked these games as they encouraged grassroots cricket. They were less popular with the tourists as they involved travelling to distant grounds to play in front of small crowds. However, one or two of these games were useful at the beginning of the tour to allow the players to warm up and Bunbury was close enough to Fremantle and Perth for hundreds to come and see the game. The Country teams could sometime surprise the opposition, and this team included three first-class players, including spinners Morgan Herbert and Eric James, both players for Tambellup–Cranbrook. Hutton won the toss and the MCC belted 344/5 in less than a day with Hutton (59), Edrich (129), Graveney (58) and Cowdrey (48 not out) entertaining the crowd. A declaration before stumps saw no Country wickets fall and 51 was added for the first wicket, but then Big Jim McConnon's off-spin worked its way through the middle order as he took 5/30 after Peter Loader (4/35) and Tyson (1/35) removed the openers and the home side were all out for 116. Put back in again they survived the day, and the match, at 128/6 with Colin Cowdrey's good natured leg-spin taking 4/35. Tyson ploughed up the sand on his long run up and could not bowl at full pace and was described by one reporter as a zephyr rather than a typhoon.

Western Australia vs MCC

Perth was far removed from the other states and provided no Australian Test players in the series. It would not host a Test until 1970 and after these initial games the MCC would not return. Len Hutton won the toss and put Western Australia in with immediate results on a fast, rain-freshed pitch as both openers went for ducks and Ken Meuleman retiring hurt after being hit on the head by Brian Statham (6/23). Trevor Bailey took 2/36, but the home team managed to recover from 7/3 and 57/7 to 103 all out thanks to captain Keith Carmody (25) and Meuleman (23) when he returned before both were removed by Peter Loader (2/26). Hutton made more runs than this himself, making 145 out of 250/3 before he retired hurt with a pulled leg muscle, handing over the captaincy to Peter May. Only Cowdrey made any runs afterwards as the MCC collapsed to 266/6 and 321 all out with Harry Gorringe taking 4/102, but by the end of the day Western Australia were 32/3 and still 186 runs behind. Ken Meuleman (109) and Keith Carmody (75) led the fightback with a stand of 128, but after their demise the team collapsed to 197/8 and were out for 255. Statham (3/68) missed out on a ten wicket haul, but was still the best of the bowlers. The spinner Ronald Sarre (2/11) made things difficult, but the MCC made 40/3 for a seven wicket win with well over day to spare.

Western Australia Combined XI vs MCC

In the days when state matches were seen as a source of entertainment and revenue and not just practice for the Tests extra matches were improvised to generate money and to allow the selectors to see promising players in action, or to allow the crowd to see the international players. So a week after their defeat Western Australia was reinforced with the presence of Neil Harvey, Graeme Hole and Ian Johnson. Peter May was the MCC captain as Hutton was still injured and won the toss. In keeping with the strategy of putting the opposition in against the England fast bowling attack the Combined XI were asked to bat and crashed to 86 all out. Only the opener Jack Rutherford (39) scored more than 9 and Brian Statham topped the bowling figures with 3/21, Tyson (2/14), Bailey (2/16) and Wardle (2/11) all took cheap wickets, but Godfrey Evans had the most dismissals with 4 catches and a stumping. Bill Edrich was bowled for a duck, Ian Johnson (3/44) took 2 more wickets in his first over and the MCC were 60/3 at stumps. The next day May made a superb 129 on a poor pitch, adding 179 with Vic Wilson (72), but the last 7 wickets fell for 90 runs and the tourists were out for 311. After facing a few balls in the evening the Combined XI fell again, but less spectacularly than in the first innings . No batsman made more than 38, but four made over twenty before they were spun out by Johnny Wardle (4/34) and Bob Appleyard (3/36). The MCC won by an innings and 62 runs and earned another rest day before they flew east.

South Australia vs MCC

South Australia were a tougher proposition and Len Hutton, back as captain, decided to bat first on a pitch that looked full of runs (but wasn't). Bill Edrich was out for another duck and only Denis Compton, flown in the day before after a knee operation in England, made any headway with 113. The rotund slow left arm bowler Jack Wilson took 5/81 despite the wicket not turning and they were out for 246. South Australia overtook this the next day regardless of 5/62 from Frank Tyson as Les Favell increased his hopes of Test selection with 84, adding 119 for the first wicket with David Harris (48). They reached the MCC total at 246/7 by the end of the day, but after the rest day only wicket-keeper Gil Langley (38 not out) added any more runs as they fell to 254 all out, a lead of only 8. Batting again the MCC innings revolved around Hutton's steadfast 98 as they were out for 181, Jack Wilson (4/32) again the destroyer. Their innings ended at stumps and there was a crowd of 6,000 to see the local team beat the tourists. As in the first innings Les Favell (47) did well, but like the MCC innings only the first man in made any runs as South Australia slipped from 95/2 to 152 all out thanks to Bob Appleyard (5/46). The crowd did not appreciate the MCC's 21 run win and booed them off the ground.

Australian XI vs MCC

In Melbourne the tourists were to play an Australian XI made up Test hopefuls like Colin McDonald, Bobby Simpson, Richie Benaud, Jim de Courcy, Ray Harvey along with veterans Neil Harvey, Bill Johnston, reserve wicket-keeper Len Maddocks and the new Australian captain Ian Johnson. Vice-captain Peter May led the MCC again, won the toss and decided to bat so that the batsmen could find their form before the First Test, but they did not. Reg Simpson top-scored with 74 and May made 45, but the team were out for 205 before the spinners Johnson (6/66) and Benaud (3/58) despite the wicket turning little. The Australian XI did little better ending the second day on 167/7, Ronald Briggs (48) and Benaud (47) the top scorers as Trevor Bailey took 4/53 with his swing bowling. The third day was washed out, as was the fourth replacement day and the game ended in a draw.

New South Wales vs MCC

New South Wales was the strongest state the MCC would meet on the tour, winning the Sheffield Shield 14 times in 16 seasons between 1948–49 and 1961–62 and nearly 60,000 people came to see the champions take on the touring team over the course of the four day match. New South Wales were led by the flamboyant Keith Miller who won the toss and put the visitors in to bat, much to Len Hutton's annoyance as he wanted to do the same. Again he had to rescue the innings, making 102 and only receiving support from the baby-faced Colin Cowdrey who had yet to make a century in the County Championship, but made a sweetly timed 110 as they added 163 together. No other batsman exceeded 11 and the team was out for 252. Miller rotated his bowlers and the wickets were shared by Pat Crawford (3/51) whose drag allowed him to bowl a yard down the wicket, Alan Davidson (3/41), bowling with a shoulder injury, and the slow left-arm wrist-spin of John Treanor (3/64). Young Billy Watson, playing in his second First Class match raced to 155 and with the help of his captain's 86 took New South Wales past the MCC score three wickets down. From there wickets fell steadily to Frank Tyson 4/98 and Alec Bedser 4/117, who was suffering from a rash, and they were all out for 382. To try out potential openers Hutton put Vic Wilson and Cowdrey in first. Wilson was out for a duck, but Cowdrey made another hundred (103), but only Hutton himself (87), batting at number 6, gave him any help. The MCC were out for 327, Cowdrey and Hutton making 402 of the 577 runs scored, the other 9 batsmen making 117 in two innings. Even Miller saw that 198 for victory in 75 minutes was impossible and sent in his young players for batting practice and Cowdrey went for 38 runs off 3 overs doing bowling impressions of Ray Lindwall, Keith Miller and others, but Peter Loader took 2/14 before the gamed ended with New South Wales on 78/2.

Queensland vs MCC

This was the last match before the First Test on the same ground and was played in stifling heat and humidity. Peter May captained again to give Hutton a rest. Ron Archer, captain of Queensland (the brother of the Australian all-rounder Ken Archer) won the toss and put the MCC in to bat on a good wicket. Reg Simpson opened with 136, but again only two batsman did anything as Denis Compton added 110 runs and everybody else 56. The tourists were 18/3 before the 234 run Simpson-Compton partnership and collapsed from 252/4 to 304 all out thereafter. Ray Lindwall took 4/66, but had to retire because of gastric trouble. Strangely every batsman in the Queensland team except the absent Lindwall got into double figures, but none of them made fifty and they were out for 288. Mick Harvey made 49 and thrashed a ball into Jim McConnon's groin, a painful injury that put the unlucky spinner out of contention for weeks. Alex Bedser still had his unexplained rash, but bowled 31 eight ball overs for 2/56 and Brian Statham and Trevor Bailey both took 3/74. The MCC made 288 as well in their second innings despite being 8/2 when the makeshift opener Colin Cowdrey and wicket-keeper Keith Andrew batting at number 3 were out for ducks. Simpson made 38, but it was May (77), Compton (69) and Bailey (51 not out) who made the runs as no bowler took more than 2 wickets. There was no time to consider a run chase, but Simpson surprised everybody when his off-spinners took 2/5 to leave Queensland on 25/2.

First Test - Brisbane

See Main Article - 1954-55 Ashes series

Queensland Country vs MCC

After the horrors of the Brisbane Test the MCC got to play another upcountry game played in a rodeo dustbowl. Hutton won the toss, batted and put on 112 with Bill Edrich (74), who seemed to have regained his form, before he was out for 40. Peter May made 69 and Vic Wilson 61, but the last five wickets fell for 26 runs., from 291/5 to 317 all out, with the retired Queensland leg spinner Donald Watt taking 5/56 with help from fellow leggie Kenneth Jenkins (4/44). The innings had reduced the makeshift wicket to the consistency of a golf bunker and Hutton allowed it to be rebuilt for the next day. Opener Wilfred Brown top scored with 22 in the Country innings as they collapsed to 95 off 42.1 eight-ball overs with Peter Loader (3/22), Johnny Wardle (2/22), Bob Appleyard (2/18) and Tom Graveney (2/8) sharing the wickets. Hutton put them straight back in again and this time they did better, Brown making 78 and adding 108 for the second wicket with Renald Sippel (45), but Appleyard (7/51) spun his way through the rest of the batting order with some help from Graveney (2/49). The home team agreed to play past stumps so that the MCC could dismiss them, and the tourists won by an innings and 12 runs. This received some criticism in the Australian press, who forgot that Hutton had sportingly allowed the wicket to be remade.

Prime Minister's XI vs MCC

The cricket loving Prime Minister of Australia Robert Menzies invited the MCC to a reception on the evening before the match and the ex-Australian captain Lindsay Hassett recited a ditty about facing "Typhoon" Tyson.
They say that this bloke Tyson is fast!
Faster than Larwood so they say!
They also say that he takes a run-up of a hundred yards!
Fast - psshaw! I'm not scared of him and his long run.
Tomorrow when I bat, I'll hook him out of sight!
 
When he finished there was a thunder-clap from the storm outside "Listen, he's just started his run-up!" joked Hassett. The match was a game played in one day with each side playing one innings rather than Limited overs cricket in the modern sense of the term. Hutton won the toss and opened with Bill Edrich, but both were out for 25/2, but Peter May made 101 and added 98 with Vic Wilson (29) and 76 with Tom Graveney (56). Johnny Wardle scooped and swatted 37 not out and the MCC declared on 278/7 after 40 eight-ball overs. The match had a party atmosphere and Hassett gave 9 of his players a bowl, six of them took a wicket and himself 2/34 with his medium pacers. Tailender Ian Johnson opened the Australian batting and was out for 4, but his partner was the big hitting Richie Benaud who smashed the ball all over the ground in his 113 as the Prime Minister's XI made 247 off 30.3 overs. One of his sixes was caught by the Governor General Field Marshal Sir William Slim and a businessman donated £35 and 10 shillings to local charities, 30 shillings for each six and 10 for each four. Veteran batsman Sam Loxton hit 47 and Keith Miller 38 as Bill Edrich's fast bowling cost him 40 runs off 5 overs, though he did take 2 wickets. Johnny Wardle (4/73) produced a middle order collapse from 195/2 to 234/7 with Vic Wilson helping him with three catches. When Hassett came in to bat Tyson was brought on and took an outrageously long run up before bowling a slow donkey drop. He then bowled a real bouncer that hit Hassett on the hand before catching him off Len Hutton's leg spin (3/15) for a 31 run victory.

Victoria vs MCC

The MCC continued south to play Victoria in Adelaide. Hutton won the toss and decided to bat with Trevor Bailey as his opening partner. This made sense in that "Barnacle Bailey" was a negative stonewaller and unlikely to give his wicket away, but it robbed the lower order of its sheet-anchor. In 1958-59 Ashes series he would be the regular opener and was blamed for paralysing the England batting with his slow scoring, though this was hardly his fault. On this occasion he made 60 and put on 97 with Hutton (41) before both were removed by the veteran all-rounder Sam Loxton (2/54). Nobody bettered his analysis though three others took 2 wickets, but Len Maddocks took three catches and ran out Colin Cowdrey for 79. Tom Graveney made 48 as the MCC were out for 312 on the rain affected second day. Taking advice from his old coach Alf Gover, who was in Australia as a journalist covering the series, Tyson stopped using his laborious 38 yard run up and returned to the "short" 18 yard run up he had used for Knypersley in the Staffordshire League with ten short then ten long final strides. Tyson took 6/68 in three over bursts when Victoria replied with 277, five of them clean bowled. It would have been 8/68, but Johnny Wardle dropped John Chambers (42) because he was singing a Bing Crosby song and Sam Loxton feathered a thin edge to Godfrey Evans, but was given not out. Neil Harvey had failed in every game against the tourists so far, except in the Test, and was playing and missing constantly on his way to 59. A construction worker on the ground shouted "Typhoon! Bowl 'im down a piano! P'rhaps 'e can play that!". The Hutton-Bailey partnership added only 26, but Peter May made a sterling 105 not out and added 120 with Colin Cowdrey (54) and the innings was declared on 236/5 after the third day was lost. Just as important the Victoria and Australia captain Ian Johnson pulled a muscle while fielding and missed the Second Test as a result. Loxton took 2/67 and Maddocks and took two more catches to strengthen his claims for the Australian gloves. Victoria batted out the game for 88/3, but Colin McDonald retired hurt on before scoring a run due to an undisclosed ailment.

Second Test - Sydney

See Main Article - 1954-55 Ashes series

Northern New South Wales vs MCC

The MCC played the Northern Districts of New South Wales in a three-day match which did not count as First Class even though the team was as strong as some state sides. Len Hutton, Frank Tyson and Brian Statham took a rest after the exhausting Second Test and Peter May led the side. The Northern Districts batted first and Ron Harvey made 41 to take the score to 85/4. Robert MacDonald (63) batted through the lower order, but they collapsed to Johnny Wardle's lethal mix of left-arm orthodox spin, Slow left-arm wrist-spin and reverse googlies as he took 6/36 and the home side fell from 192/5 to 211 all out. The MCC batted to 438, their highest score of the tour so far with Jim McConnon, having recovered from his injury, making 43 as an opener, Denis Compton 60, Peter May a majestic 157 and wicket-keeper Godfrey Evans 69. batting again the home team did better with 246 with seven batsmen getting to double figures, but the medium paced off-spin of Bob Appleyard (5/59) took their toll with the in-swingers and leg-cutters of Alec Bedser (3/49) helping out. The MCC made the 20 runs needed to win for the loss of makeshift opener Godfrey Evans and won by 9 wickets.

Third Test - Melbourne

See Main Article - 1954-55 Ashes series

Tasmania Combined XI vs MCC

Some of the oldest grade clubs in Australia are in Tasmania, but it was a weak state side that did not fully complete in the Sheffield Shield for another twenty years. Richie Benaud, Alan Davidson, Les Favell and Neil Harvey were flown out to help the Tasmanian team in another Combined XI. Thanks to the Third Test a record 20,000 spectators turned out on the small Hobart ground to watch. The Tasmanian captain Emerson Rodwell won the toss and batted only to see Favell out for a duck, thanks to Alec Bedser (3/56) as the ball swung heavily. Peter Loader (4/81) took two more wickets and Benaud was caught off "Big Al" to leave them 72/4, but Harvey (82) and Rodwell (72) added 60 before Trevor Bailey (3/29) reduced 132/4 to 146/7. Rodwell added another 54 runs with Terence Cowley (12) before Bailey caught him off Bedser, Loader took the last two wickets and the Combined XI were out for 221. This looked good as the tourists now fell to the swing bowling of Alan Davidson (4/45) as they collapsed to 167/7 with Denis Compton making 46. Bailey stuck around for 53 and Bedser took the score up to 242 with 19. The Combined XI batted again, but waited until they were 184/6 before Rodwell declared, with Neil Harvey 47 and Richie Benaud 68 not out. The unlucky Jim McConnon broke his little finger when fielding a powerful Harvey on-drive, as it would take until the end of the tour to mend he was sent home when they reached the mainland. The MCC had an hour and forty minutes to make 164 for victory so Hutton sent Keith Andrew to open, but he was soon out and Reg Simpson (37 not out) and Vic Wilson (33 not out) together at the end on 99/2.

Tasmania vs MCC

Bereft of its Australian players Tasmania suffered in the state match against the tourists, but still 12,000 came to see the game at Launceston. Hutton, who was lucky with the toss in Australia, won again, chose this time to bat and made 61, but the star of the day was the stylish Tom Graveney with 134. They added 127 for the second wicket, then Graveney put on 105 with Denis Compton (50) for the third. There was a small collapse from 243/2 to 281/6, but Vic Wilson (cricketer) (62 not out) and Johnny Wardle entertained with 111 for the sixth wicket and Hutton declared at 427/7 on the second morning, Noel Diprose the best of the bowlers with 4/107. The Tasmanians had no answer to the in-swing and off-cutters of Peter Loader who took 6/22 off 12 eight-ball overs and were out for 117, captain Emerson Rodwell had to retire hurt on 2, but returned to be bowled by Loader for 11. Hutton, 310 runs ahead elected to bat again, perhaps to entertain the Saturday crowd the next day and sent in nightwatchmen Frank Tyson to open with Reg Simpson. Simpson failed again, ending his chances of playing in the Tests and Bob Appleyard joined Tyson. The MCC scratched round the next day for 133/6 declared, Tyson's 27 was the top score and Terence Cowley took 4/53. Tasmania had no chance of making 444 runs to win and Hutton took the chance to exercise his bowlers. Mike Hyland (49) and added 60 with John Maddox (62 not out), who made his highest First Class score, but was left standing as the rest fell away and Tasmania were out for 200 for a 243 run win.

South Australia Country vs MCC

The touring team's run of form since the Second Test continued with a big win over a South Australian Country XI. Vice-captain May captained the MCC, who batted again for 328. All the middle order made runs; Reg Simpson 68, Peter May 62, Tom Graveney 44 and Denis Compton 53, though Trevor Bailey was caught leg before by G. Gross (3/31) for a duck. After a second wicket stand of 44 the Country XI toppled to 106 all out to the accurate Brian Statham 2/16 and the medium pace off-spinners and off-cutters of the "Applecart" (6/26). Following on they did even worse as Alex Bedser (3/11) removed the first three batsmen for three runs, but Brian Statham's dictum of "if they miss, I hit" was never more proved as he clean bowled six batsmen in a row, the last five for ducks in his extraordinary analysis of 4-3-3-6. The opener H.G. Bennett carried his bat for 14 not out and added none of the 14 runs for the last wicket as last man Gross made them all before being caught leg before wicket by Bailey. With the Country XI out for 45 the MCC won by an innings and 177 runs.

South Australia vs MCC

After sailing back to Adelaide the MCC were to play South Australia in the run up the Adelaide Test. Their captain "Pancho" Ridings won the toss and batted on a belter of a wicket, but was let down badly by his team as they were rolled over for 185 on the first day as all the England bowlers took wickets. Only Ridings himself (40) and wicket-keeper Gil Langley (53) made any resistance. With Peter May in charge Len Hutton, Godfrey Evans, Trevor Bailey, Frank Tyson, Brian Statham went to the races at Cheltenham Park Racecourse and Tyson won £50 (his tour fee was £600). When he returned he regretted it as Denis Compton had made a century of genius, 182 gold-stroked runs as he added 234 with May (114). Colin Cowdrey added 64 and Donald Gregg took 4/117 as the MCC batted into the third day to make 451, their best score of the entire tour. South Australia began their second innings 266 runs behind and collapsed again, only Ridings (40 not out) giving any resistance to Peter Loader (4/32) and Alec Bedser (3/20), the two bowlers fighting for a Test place. The MCC won by a crushing margin of an innings and 143 runs, the perfect result for the vital Fourth Test.

Fourth Test - Adelaide

See Main Article - 1954-55 Ashes series

Victoria Country vs MCC

After winning The Ashes the MCC went to their final Country match in a jovial mood. Only three regular bowlers were taken, Alec Bedser, Peter Loader and Johnny Wardle, both wicket-keepers and the manager Geoffrey Howard. The Country XI won the toss, batted and were out for 182 with one Bill Young making 56 as Loader (4/29) and Wardle (5/46) were far too good for the bulk of the local batsmen. Len Hutton (75) and Reg Simpson (59) were 130/0 at the end of the day and Tom Graveney made 50 in the morning and Hutton was impressed with Rex Hollioake (2/69), the fast bowler from Ballarat, who he thought was quicker than any Australian outside the Tests. Vic Wilson, Godfrey Evans and Wardle all made 17, and Hutton declared with Howard unbeaten on 0 at 307/8. The Country team were completely unable to read Johnny Wardle's highly varied off-breaks, leg-breaks and reverse-googlies and he finished with 7/45 (12/91 in the match), though Ron Milne came in a number 4 and finished 22 not out in a score of 99. The MCC won by an innings and 26 runs.

Victoria vs MCC

The return tour match against Victoria was almost entirely washed out, except for the second day. Sam Loxton won the toss and batted on a pitch that had sweated under the covers and Victoria promptly crashed to 39/6. Brian Statham (3/23) took the first three wickets, followed by Trevor Bailey (3/22) with the second three. Loxton (27) and Allan Dick (41) made a rescue attempt with a stand of 53, until Bob Appleyard (3/14) took the next three wickets and Johnny Wardle (1/14) finished off the innings for 113. Reg Simpson and captain Peter May both made 33 not out in 99/1 in reply and the match was given up as the rain returned.

New South Wales vs MCC

The MCC returned to Sydney for their last state match and the Fifth and final Test. 34,198 fans came to watch the game over four days and despite frequent rain the match was fought to a finish and they were far from disappointed. The New South Wales captain Keith Miller won the toss and the Sheffield Shield champions elected to bat, but collapsed spectacularly to 3/3 as Alec Bedser (5/57) returned to form, removing both openers for ducks and having Richie Benaud caught by Johnny Wardle for one. Tom Graveney at slip caught the 18-year-old Bobby Simpson off Frank Tyson for 6 and Keith Miller off Peter Loader for 11 and New South Wales were 25/6. The 20 old Peter Philpott (46) and 21-year-old "Sam" Booth (74 not out) rescued the innings with a stand of 83, but Bedser returned to dismiss Philpot and Alan Davidson, Graveney's third catch. Johnny Wardle had wicket-keeper Ossie Lambert caught by Colin Cowdrey and Vic Wilson (2/1) came in at the end and took two wickets for one run off nine balls, Graveney taking his fourth catch to end the innings on 172 when John Treanor went for a duck. Keith Miller bowled Wilson for a duck and Pat Crawford got Peter May for 3 and the MCC ended the day on 4/2. They did not immediately improve their situation in the morning as Alan Davidson (4/25) dismissed nightwatchman Peter Loader for a duck after he had been hit hard on the thigh by Miller, Reg Simpson for 6 and Colin Cowdrey for 12, and the MCC were 35/5. Tom Graveney (35) and Len Hutton (48) rescued the innings with a stand of 59, Hutton ironically batting at number 7 to give himself a rest, Godfrey Evans made a perky 40, Johnny Wardle slashed his way to 19, but Tyson was run out by Ronald Briggs for 3 and the innings closed on 172, the scores even. Briggs was bowled by Tyson for a duck (and a pair), but Test hopefuls Jim Burke (98) and Bobby Simpson (62) saw out the day and added 159 for the second wicket, the injured Loader unable to bowl. When it rained the umpires refused to stop play and Hutton led his men off, leaving Simpson waiting at the crease on 98. When play resumed the angry Simpson was fooled by a Johnny Wardle left-arm reverse-googly and stumped. Graveney took his fifth catch off Wardle (5/118) to dispose of Burke and Davidson was caught by Cowdrey for a duck to leave New South Wales 196/4. Richie Benaud (59) and Miller (71) added 64, smashing Wilson for 42 runs off 4 eight ball overs before Benaud was stumped off Wardle. Bedser (2/87) dismissed both Miller and Booth and Miller declared half an hour from stumps on 314/8. The MCC needed 315 to win in just over a day, but Hutton tried to have another "rest" by batting at number 5 and Simpson (24) and Graveney (28) opened the innings. They were 26/0 at the end of the day, but both fell to Benaud (2/62). Wilson was bowled by Davidson (2/43) for 4 and the tourists were in trouble at 68/3. Peter May (42), Len Hutton (59), Crowdrey (33) and Evans (39) kept the runs coming even though wickets fell at regular intervals. At 250/6 needed only 65 more runs, but leg-spinner John Treanor (3/39) cleaned up the tail as they slumped from 261/7 to 269 all out and New South Wales won a thrilling 45 run victory, the only defeat the tourists suffered except for the First Test. It was a stunning vindication of Keith Miller's inspirational captaincy, but it was too late for the Ashes and he never became the captain of Australia.

Fifth Test - Sydney

See Main Article - 1954-55 Ashes series

Tour First Class Averages
source As was the convention of the time gentleman amateurs have their initials in front of their surname and professional players have their initials after their name, if their initials were used at all.

References

Bibliography
 Peter Arnold, The Illustrated Encyclopedia of World Cricket, W. H. Smith, 1985
 Ashley Brown, The Pictorial History of Cricket, Bison, 1988
 E.W. Swanton, Swanton in Australia with MCC 1946-1975, Fontana/Collins, 1975
 Frank Tyson, In the Eye of the Typhoon: The Inside Story of the MCC Tour of Australia and New Zealand 1954/55, Parrs Wood Press, 2004
 Bob Willis and Patrick Murphy, Starting With Grace: A Pictorial Celebration of Cricket, 1864-1986, Stanley Paul, 1986

Further reading
 John Arlott, Australian Test Journal. A Diary of the Test Matches Australia v. England 1954-55, The Sportsman's Book Club, 1956
 John Arlott, John Arlott's 100 Greatest Batsmen, MacDonald Queen Anne Press, 1986
 Sidney Barnes, The Ashes Ablaze: The M. C. C. Australian tour,1954-55, Kimber, 1955
 Bill Frindall, The Wisden Book of Test Cricket 1877-1978, Wisden, 1979
 Arthur Gilligan, The Urn Returns: A Diary of the 1954-55 M. C. C. Tour of Australia, Deutsch, 1955
 Tom Graveney and Norman Miller, The Ten Greatest Test Teams  Sidgewick and Jackson, 1988
 Chris Harte, A History of Australian Cricket, Andre Deutsch, 1993
 Alan Hill, Daring Young Men: MCC Tour to Australia - 1954-55, Methuen Publishing Ltd, 2004
 Ken Kelly and David Lemmon, Cricket Reflections : Five Decades of Cricket Photographs, Heinemann, 1985
 Keith Miller, Cricket Crossfire, Oldbourne Press, 1956
 Ian Peebles, The Ashes 1954-55, Hodder and Stoughton, 1955
 Playfair Cricket Annual 1955
 Ray Robinson, On Top Down Under, Cassell, 1975
 Alan Ross, Australia 55: A Journal of the MCC Tour, Joseph, 1955
 E.W. Swanton and C.B. Fry, Test Matches of 1954/55 Victory in Australia, The Daily Telegraph, 1955
 E.W. Swanton (ed), Barclay's World of Cricket, Willow, 1986
 Roy Webber, The Australians in England, A Record of the 21 Australian Cricket Tours of England 1878-1953, Hodder & Stoughton, 1953
 Crawford White, England Keep the Ashes: The Record of the England and M. C. C. Tour of Australia, 1954-55, News Chronicle, 1955
 Wisden Cricketers' Almanack 1956, "MCC in Australia and New Zealand, 1954-55"

External links

1954 in Australian cricket
1954 in English cricket
1955 in Australian cricket
1955 in English cricket
Australian cricket seasons from 1945–46 to 1969–70
English cricket tours of Australia
International cricket competitions from 1945–46 to 1960
Australia 1954-55